Akwa Ibom State Polytechnic is a tertiary learning institution in Ikot Osurua, Ikot Ekpene, Akwa Ibom State, Nigeria. It was founded in 1991. The institution is accredited by the National Board for Technical Education (NBTE) with the mandate to provide access to education in technology and commerce.

Courses 
The polytechnic runs various courses under schools/faculties such as Applied Sciences, Communication Arts, Preliminary Studies, Business and Management, Engineering, Environmental Studies and Legal Studies.

The polytechnic is owned by Akwa Ibom State. In 2019, the Governor of the State promised to give the institution a grant of One hundred million naira to ensure that all the courses they offer are fully accredited.

See also
List of polytechnics in Nigeria

References

External links 

 https://akwaibompoly.edu.ng/

Universities and colleges in Nigeria
Education in Akwa Ibom State
Educational institutions established in 1991
1991 establishments in Nigeria
Academic libraries in Nigeria